Sockburn is an industrial suburb of Christchurch, New Zealand, located between Hornby and Riccarton, some  west of the Christchurch city centre. The suburb is roughly bounded by the triangle formed by State Highway 1 in the west, Main South Road (SH73a) in the south and SH73 in the north. The suburb of Wigram, containing the city's former RNZAF base (now an aviation museum), is located nearby. One of the city's main horseracing circuits, Riccarton Racecourse, is located close to Sockburn's northern edge, and Racecourse was the initial name for the area. The name Sockburn is likely to have come from the village of Sockburn in County Durham, England.

The name of Sockburn is most often currently associated with its role in arterial routes south from the city, with Main South Road (formerly part of State Highway 1) crossing the Sockburn Overbridge and having a major junction at the Sockburn roundabout, where the road splits into two main routes to the city, one extending through the commercial heart of Riccarton, and the other, Blenheim Road, passing to the south through a light industrial area.

Demographics
Sockburn comprises two statistical areas. Sockburn North is residential, and Sockburn South is industrial.

Sockburn North

Sockburn North had a population of 4,023 at the 2018 New Zealand census, an increase of 171 people (4.4%) since the 2013 census, and an increase of 459 people (12.9%) since the 2006 census. There were 1,410 households. There were 2,004 males and 2,022 females, giving a sex ratio of 0.99 males per female. The median age was 39.1 years (compared with 37.4 years nationally), with 534 people (13.3%) aged under 15 years, 999 (24.8%) aged 15 to 29, 1,605 (39.9%) aged 30 to 64, and 888 (22.1%) aged 65 or older.

Ethnicities were 61.6% European/Pākehā, 6.3% Māori, 4.2% Pacific peoples, 30.8% Asian, and 3.4% other ethnicities (totals add to more than 100% since people could identify with multiple ethnicities).

The proportion of people born overseas was 38.9%, compared with 27.1% nationally.

Although some people objected to giving their religion, 41.0% had no religion, 45.9% were Christian, 2.6% were Hindu, 1.6% were Muslim, 1.3% were Buddhist and 2.1% had other religions.

Of those at least 15 years old, 750 (21.5%) people had a bachelor or higher degree, and 657 (18.8%) people had no formal qualifications. The median income was $24,400, compared with $31,800 nationally. The employment status of those at least 15 was that 1,530 (43.9%) people were employed full-time, 507 (14.5%) were part-time, and 108 (3.1%) were unemployed.

Sockburn South

Sockburn South had a population of 375 at the 2018 New Zealand census, an increase of 30 people (8.7%) since the 2013 census, and an increase of 27 people (7.8%) since the 2006 census. There were 132 households. There were 207 males and 165 females, giving a sex ratio of 1.25 males per female. The median age was 34.5 years (compared with 37.4 years nationally), with 51 people (13.6%) aged under 15 years, 99 (26.4%) aged 15 to 29, 189 (50.4%) aged 30 to 64, and 33 (8.8%) aged 65 or older.

Ethnicities were 57.6% European/Pākehā, 16.8% Māori, 4.0% Pacific peoples, 24.8% Asian, and 5.6% other ethnicities (totals add to more than 100% since people could identify with multiple ethnicities).

The proportion of people born overseas was 30.4%, compared with 27.1% nationally.

Although some people objected to giving their religion, 52.8% had no religion, 26.4% were Christian, 1.6% were Hindu, 3.2% were Muslim, 2.4% were Buddhist and 6.4% had other religions.

Of those at least 15 years old, 45 (13.9%) people had a bachelor or higher degree, and 57 (17.6%) people had no formal qualifications. The median income was $35,600, compared with $31,800 nationally. The employment status of those at least 15 was that 192 (59.3%) people were employed full-time, 36 (11.1%) were part-time, and 21 (6.5%) were unemployed.

Chokebore Lodge

Chokebore Lodge is a cob cottage built in the late 1850s. It was named by a new owner, Henry Redwood in 1874 after a shotgun type with which he was skilled.

Education
Our Lady of Victories School is a Catholic full primary school catering for years 1 to 8. The property is listed by Heritage New Zealand.

St Thomas of Canterbury College is a Catholic boys secondary school catering for years 7 to 13.

References

Suburbs of Christchurch